Patrício Antônio Boques  or simply  Patrício  (born October 8, 1974, in Porto Alegre), is a Brazilian right wingback.

Honours
Brazilian Série B: 2005
Rio Grande do Sul State Championship: 2006, 2007

External links
 sambafoot
 CBF
 Guardian Stats Centre
 globoesporte
 zerozero.pt

1974 births
Sportspeople from Rio Grande do Sul
Living people
Brazilian footballers
Paraná Clube players
Sociedade Esportiva e Recreativa Caxias do Sul players
Grêmio Foot-Ball Porto Alegrense players
CR Vasco da Gama players
Guarani FC players
Clube 15 de Novembro players
Esporte Clube Bahia players
Associação Desportiva São Caetano players
Association football defenders